Monaco elects on the national level a legislature (parliament). The National Council (Conseil National) has 24 members, elected for a five-year term, 16 elected by a winner-take-all plurality system, and the other 8 by proportional representation. Each voter may cast a ballot with up to 16 candidates' names. First, the 16 individuals with the most votes are elected. Then, votes are counted by party groups to fill the remaining 8 seats. E.g., if a party polled 51% of the votes it would probably win 20 out of 24 seats (all 16 of the winner-take-all seats and then 4 of the 8 proportional seats).

Latest elections

2023

2018

See also
 Electoral calendar
 Electoral system

References

External links
Adam Carr's Election Archive
Parties and elections

 
Politics of Monaco